Dongguk University (Korean: 동국대학교, Hanja: 東國大學校) is a private, coeducational university in South Korea, fundamentally based on Buddhism. Established in 1906 as Myeongjin School (명진학교; 明進學校) by Buddhist pioneers of the Association of Buddhism Research (불교연구회; 佛敎硏究會), the university gained full university status as Dongguk University in 1953. The university remains one of the few Buddhist-affiliated universities in the world, and is a member of the International Association of Buddhist Universities.

Situated on a hill near Namsan, the university's Seoul campus is in the urban Jung-gu District of central Seoul. The university's symbol animal is an elephant, which stemmed from Queen Māyā of Sakya's precognitive dream of a white elephant about the birth of The Buddha, and the symbol flower is a lotus blossom which reflects the Buddhist truth.

Dongguk University Seoul campus is organised into 127 undergraduate and graduate schools, which enrolled 13,701 undergraduate students and 1,801 graduate students and granted 3,140 bachelor's, 470 master's and 172 doctorate degrees in 2017. Its comprehensive academic programme offers 53 undergraduate majors, together with 59 graduate programmes.

The university also operates campuses in Peckham, Gyeongju, and Los Angeles, United States. The university operates two affiliated hospitals of Western medicine, and four of Oriental medicine, a generic term which includes traditional Korean medicine studies.

History

Origins of Dongguk University

The university began as Myeongjin School on May 8, 1906. It was established by the Association of Buddhism Research to provide Buddhist education.

In 1910, Myeongjin School was renamed Buddhist Normal School (불교사범학교; 佛敎師範學校), and later renamed Buddhist Higher Education Institution (불교고등강숙; 佛敎高等講塾) in 1914. It became the Central Education Institution (중앙학림; 中央學林) in 1915, but was closed by the Japanese Occupation Government from 1922 to 1928 for its connection to the Samil Undong uprising.

In 1928, the foundation of the Buddhist Specialised School (불교전수학교; 佛敎專修學校) was permitted after Buddhist temples all across colonial Korea donated 601,425 yen and established the Central Administrative Headquarters of the Joseon Buddhism Foundation (조선불교중앙교무원; 朝鮮佛敎中央敎務院) in 1924.

In 1930 it became the Central Buddhist Professional School (중앙불교전문학교; 中央佛敎專門學校) and in 1940 the school was renamed Hyehwa Professional School (혜화전문학교; 惠化專門學校).

On May 30, 1944, Hyehwa Professional School was again closed by Empire of Japan following the mobilization. After the World War II the school was reopened on October 27, 1945, and was expanded into Dongguk College (동국대학; 東國大學) on September 20, 1946.

Expansion 
In 1951 after the Third Battle of Seoul, the college withdrew from Seoul, and provisional lectures were held in Jung District, Busan until the college got back to the original place September 1953 after the Korean War. Dongguk College was one of the first institutions in the South Korea to gain university status in the western sense, being designated the present-day Dongguk University in 1953. The postgraduate school opened simultaneously.

From 1950s to 1980s, the university underwent a major vitalisation. Construction of Myeongjin Hall which is the oldest building in the university now began on March, 1956, and finished on December 30. In 1959, the Dongguk University Broadcasting system was initiated. The university took over Eunseok Elementary School in 1965, Heunguk Middle–High School in 1966, and Keumsan Middle–Commercial High school and Myeongseong Girls' Middle–High School in 1967. The College of Education was launched in 1968 with four courses, adding Physical Education major a year later. The Graduate School of Public Administration was founded in 1967, and In 1978 the Gyeongju Campus was established and opened in 1979. Also during the 1960s students of the university participated in the democratic uprisings of South Korea, which caused deaths of students of the university. Students participated in the April Revolution against the autocratic government in 1960, and the June 3 Resistance in opposition to the negotiation for the Treaty on Basic Relations between Japan and the Republic of Korea in 1964.

In 1982, the university saw an academic overhaul which divided the College of Liberal Arts and Sciences into the College of the Arts and the College of Natural Science. In 1983, the university opened Gyeongju Oriental Medicine Hospital Attached to College of Korean Medicine, and opened Pohang Hospital and Dongguk University Medical Center in 1988. In 1989, the university opened Dongguk Oriental Medicine Hospital and opened Gyeongju Hospital Attached to College of Medicine in 1991. In 1997 the university made an agreement with Royal University of America, which was the educational institution located in Los Angeles. On March 5, 2009, Royal University of America was merged into Dongguk University, finally becoming Dongguk University Los Angeles.

Modern era 
In 2008, the university sued Yale University for 50 million dollars for a national scandal involved with then-assistant professor Shin Jeong-ah, which was called "Shingate". In July, 2007, when Dongguk university sent a registered letter to Yale University in order to check whether her doctorate degree is fake, Yale sent a reply that her degree is a forgery and she was never enrolled in Yale. Dongguk University asserted that when the university was hiring Shin Jeong-ah as an assistant professor of Graduate School of Culture & Arts on September, 2005, the university had received an answer from Yale that her doctorate degree is authentic. On July, 2007, Yale contended that the Dongguk University's claim is not true and Yale had not received any official letters from Dongguk University, but later it was revealed that Yale had received the registered letter from Dongguk University. On December 27, Dongguk University held a press conference and announced that Yale had admitted that Yale confirmed the authenticity of her degree and expressed regret about the case. On February 1, 2008, Yale forwarded an official letter of apology to Dongguk University under the name of Rick Levin, then-president of Yale. Dongguk University claimed that actions of Yale had damaged the university's reputation and sued Yale for 50 million dollars. Dongguk University said that it lost millions in contributions and the opportunity to build a new law school, but the lawsuit was finally concluded with Yale's innocence over the scandal. After the lawsuit, Yale sued Dongguk University for the cost of litigation, and on December 2, 2014, the Seoul Central District Court ordered Dongguk University to pay 297,000 dollars.

In 2010, the university sought to take over Kyonggi University for the amount of around 150 billion won but provisional board of directors of Kyonggi University rejected the Dongguk University's bid. In 2012, Dongguk Business School was accredited by AACSB. In 2014, King Willem-Alexander and Queen Máxima of the Netherlands visited the university during the state visit to South Korea and attended a seminar held by Jeonggakwon, Korean Buddhist temple in the university.

Dongguk University celebrated the 111st anniversary of the foundation in 2017, and announced new motto of 지혜, 자비, 정진 (智慧, 慈悲, 精進; Wisdom, Compassion, Endeavor) which replaced the previous motto, 섭심, 신실, 자애, 도세 (攝心, 信實, 慈愛, 度世; Steady one's clean mind, Behave truly and reliably, Love people with benevolence, Save mankind from agony).

Campuses

Seoul campus
Dongguk University's main campus is located in Jung District, Seoul, just north of Namsan. The upper buildings of the campus are directly connected into the trails of Namsan park.

The campus' main entrance is at Dongguk University Station the intersection of Seoul Subway Line 3 and 4. Chungmuro Station is near the rear entrance.

 Dongguk University Station
  Chungmuro Station

The university is also served by the following Seoul metropolitan buses:
 144, 301, 420, 407, 7212

Ilsan, Goyang campus
Located near the Dongguk University Ilsan hospital, the campus concentrates in the medical technology, medicine and traditional Korean medicine.

Gyeongju campus
Opened in 1979, the campus is located in Gyeongju, North Gyeongsang Province.

Los Angeles campus
Established in 1906, after the amalgamation of the university and Royal University of America, the campus concentrates in the traditional Korean medicine.

Rankings and reputation

Since its promotion to Dongguk University in 1946, Dongguk University has produced many graduates throughout Korean society. In particular, graduates of the police administration department, which was established before the police college in 1962, occupied a large part of the police headquarters in various regions, and were also involved in the executive positions including the police chief. [5] In addition, in order to foster inter-Korean exchanges and cooperation personnel in preparation for reunification, and to nurture experts who have the ability to analyze inter-Korean relations, they established the North Korean Studies Department in Korea for the first time in 1994. [61] In 2012, the College of Business Administration received the international certification for business education from the International Business College Development Council for the tenth time in Korea.

Dongguk University was ranked 11th in JoongAng Ilbo's Korean university rankings in 2014. Dongguk University was ranked 77th among the Asian universities in 2015 QS World University Rankings, and 82nd in 2018. Dongguk University was also ranked 656th among the world and 211st among the Asian universities in CWTS Leiden Ranking in 2017.

Dongguk Business School has obtained international recognition by acquiring Association to Advance Collegiate Schools of Business (AACSB) certificates, and the business school offers a dual degree MBA programme with University of Texas at Dallas.

The university has international cooperations with nearly 160 universities of 40 nations, including Duke University, UCLA, University of Manchester, University of Oslo and Victoria University of Wellington, and attracts about 1,800 international students every year. Also, the university offers hybrid programmes with Swinburne University of Technology, University of Manitoba, University of Santo Tomas, Hindustan University and East China Normal University that combined the language education and area studies with the student exchange programme. Dongguk University also offers a dual degree programme with Stony Brook University.

Notable alumni

The police administration major in Dongguk University was founded in 1962, and alumni of Police administration major are spread out across South Korean police organisations, intelligence institutes, and judicial organisations including Korean National Police Agency. Also to prepare for the Korean reunification and to research North Korea–South Korea relations, in 1994 the university installed the North Korean studies major for the first time in Korea. In 2017, a North Korean studies alumnus Suh Hoon was appointed as the 22nd director of the National Intelligence Service of South Korea.

The Division of Theatre & Film and Media was established for the first time in South Korea in 1960, One of the top and the best film school in Korea, and had many alumni in the field of South Korean film and K-pop industry. Alumni of the Division of Theatre & Film and Media include Lee Deok-hwa, Choi Min-sik, Cho Yeo-jeong, Lee Kyu-hyung, Han Suk-kyu, Kim Hye-soo, Jun Ji-hyun, Lee Seung-gi, Park Min-young, Lee Jae-yoon, Im Yoon-ah, Son Na-eun,  Seohyun, Choi Woo-sung, and Kim Ji-won. Young K from the JYP Entertainment rock band Day6 is also an alumni but graduated with a bachelor's in Business Administration. 

Dongguk University alumni also have found success in professional sports and arts. Alumni in professional sport include baseball player Kim Seong-han, Han Dae-hwa, Song Jin-woo, Park Han-yi, footballer Ahn Hyo-yeon and mountaineer Park Young-seok, and alumni in arts include novelist Hwang Sok-yong, Jo Jung-rae, poet Shin Kyeong-nim, Moon Chung-hee, singer-songwriter Young K and painter Seok Cheoljoo.

Media
A student-run daily newspaper, Dongdae Shinmun (동대신문) was founded on April 15, 1950, and continued to circulate during Korean war, April Revolution and June Democratic Uprising. Also, a student-run English newspaper, The Dongguk Post was founded in 1965. Both newspapers are overseen by a board of directors of the university and run by a student chief editor.

University broadcasting station, Dongguk University Broadcasting System (DUBS) is founded on September 1, 1959, and focuses on broadcasting educational programmes.

Gallery

See also
List of colleges and universities in South Korea
Education in South Korea

References

External links
Official school website, in Korean and English
 Curriculum in Buddhist studies in English

 
Universities and colleges in Seoul
Universities and colleges in Gyeongju
Buddhist universities and colleges in South Korea
1906 establishments in Korea
Educational institutions established in 1906
Buddhism in Seoul
Private universities and colleges in South Korea
Jung District, Seoul